Niedersachsen was a Bremen-class frigate of the German Navy.  She was the second ship of the class, and the second surface warship to serve with one of the navies of Germany to be named after the state of Lower Saxony, . Her predecessor was the minelayer  of the Kriegsmarine. The frigate entered service with the Bundesmarine in 1982, serving for 32 years until being decommissioned in 2015.

Construction and commissioning
Niedersachsen was laid down in November 1979 at the yards of AG Weser, Bremen and launched on 9 June 1980. After undergoing trials Niedersachsen was commissioned on 15 October 1982. During her later career she was based at Wilhelmshaven as part of 4. Fregattengeschwader, forming a component of Einsatzflottille 2. Her sponsor was Adele Albrecht, wife of the then Prime Minister of Lower Saxony Ernst Albrecht.

Service
Niedersachsen participated in various international missions during her career. In October 1989 she and the destroyer Rommel and the supply ship Coburg visited Leningrad, the first German navy ships to visit a Soviet/Russian port for 77 years. Niedersachsen was frequently deployed to participate in NATO permanent monitoring missions in the Mediterranean and Atlantic, including Standing Naval Force Atlantic (SNFL) and Standing Naval Force Mediterranean (SNFM) in 1992. In 1995 Niedersachsen took part in the British-organised Joint Maritime Course, and was again part of Standing Naval Force Mediterranean in 1997. In March 1997 she was ordered into Albanian waters as part of Operation Libelle, the German-led evacuation of foreign nationals as the Albanian Civil War broke out.   Niedersachsen operated off Durres during the evacuation, using her radar to monitor Albanian airspace. Niedersachsen was again part of Standing Naval Force Atlantic in 2000 and 2004. She deployed in 2004 to participate in the NATO exercise Medshark/Majestic Eagle, and in 2007 was attached to the maritime component of the United Nations Interim Force in Lebanon.  

From 8 January to 12 June 2008 Niedersachsen deployed with Standing NATO Maritime Group 2 in the Mediterranean Sea, conducting exercises and training sessions with Italian, Turkish, US, UK and Greek ships to promote international cooperation. In February she was also part of Operation Active Endeavour, the NATO anti-terrorist and anti-smuggling mission, off the Egyptian coast and in waters off Lebanon, Albania and southern Sardinia. During this time Niedersachsen visited 17 different ports in the Mediterranean, including Aksaz Naval Base and Antalya (Turkey), Haifa (Israel), Volos (Greece), Trieste, Palermo, Naples and Savona (Italy). 

In 2011 Niedersachsen joined Operation Atalanta, the EU's anti-piracy mission off the Horn of Africa. On 20 April 2011 she carried out repairs to a disabled Yemeni dhow. On 10 June she detected a suspected Pirate Action Group (PAG), consisting of a fishing dhow and two attack skiffs, believed to have carried out a number of attacks on merchant vessels in the area.  The Niedersachsen sank the two skiffs, after which the dhow returned to Somalia. Niedersachsen returned to Operation Atalanta in 2013. While patrolling off the Somali coast on 5 November 2013 she located a whaler towing a skiff, crewed by 10 men and carrying over 10 fuel barrels and 2 long ladders. When the Niedersachsen approached the suspect vessels, the men aboard the whaler threw the ladders overboard and returned to the shore. In 2014 she was again part of Standing NATO Maritime Group 2 and deployed in support of Operation Active Endeavour.

Decommissioning
Niedersachsen was removed from active service in late December 2014, and decommissioned on 26 June 2015 after 32 years in service, in which she had covered 764,000 nautical miles.

References

External link

Bremen-class frigates
1980 ships
Ships built in Bremen (state)